(from the French ) was a historical Swedish honorific used for unmarried women from about the mid 18th-century until 1866. The title was primarily used for women in the burgher and the clergy classes.

History 

In the 18th century,  became common, although unmarried noblewomen were called  ('miss'). Similarly, the title  ('Mrs') was used only for married noblewomen, and married middle-class women were called  (from French ). After the parliamentary reform which abolished the Riksdag of the Estates in 1866, the title  was allowed for all unmarried women, and the title  – as well as the married equivalent  – ceased to be used.

The reform was mentioned in the 1866–1867 New Year's show at the Royal Dramatic Theatre in Stockholm in the satirical song (which rhymes in Swedish):

At the Royal Dramatic Theatre, however, the reform was not introduced until after director Edholm was replaced in 1881.

References 

 Johan Flodmark: Stenborgska skådebanorna
 Trygve Byström: Svenska komedien 1737-1754

Women's social titles
Titles
Honorifics
Swedish titles
Social history of Sweden